Erik Frans Oscar Eriksson (28 May 1879 – 24 August 1940) is a Swedish swimmer who competed at the 1900 Olympics in the men's 200 meters and 1000 meters freestyle, and 200 meters backstroke.

References

External links
 

1879 births
1940 deaths
Swimmers at the 1900 Summer Olympics
Olympic swimmers of Sweden
Swedish male freestyle swimmers
Swedish male backstroke swimmers
Swedish emigrants to the United States